Ndali may refer to:
 Ndali people, a people of Tanzania and Malawi
 Ndali language
 Ndali, Benin, a town in Benin